Tessa Dunlop is a historian, writer and broadcaster. She has written several oral history books and presented history programmes for the BBC, Discovery Channel Europe, Channel 4, UKTV History and the History Channel (US).  She lives in south London.

Education
Dunlop attended Pitlochry High School and read history at St Hilda's College, Oxford University, where she won the 1995 Gertrude Easton Prize for History. She also studied at Sheffield Hallam University and was awarded an MA in Imperialism and Culture and a PhD in Romanian-British history and royal imaging.

Career
After graduating, Dunlop worked for both London radio station LBC and BBC London 94.9.

She was named Regional Television Personality in the Royal Television Society's West of England Awards in 2005 for her work on the regional magazine show Inside Out West. In 2007 Dunlop filmed Paranormal Egypt, an eight-part series with Derek Acorah on location in Egypt.

Publications

Dunlop's first book, To Romania with Love, a memoir set in post-revolution Romania about how she met her future husband, was published in May 2012. Several further history books written by her have been published, most recently Army Girls.

 Tessa Dunlop (2021). Army Girls: The secrets and stories of military service from the final few women who fought in World War II. London, Headline Press ISBN 978-1472282095.

References

Living people
21st-century British historians
21st-century British women writers
Alumni of St Hilda's College, Oxford
British television presenters
British women historians
British women journalists
British women television presenters
People educated at Strathallan School
Place of birth missing (living people)
Year of birth missing (living people)